An interconnect is a link between telecommunications networks.

Interconnect may also refer to :
 Interconnect (integrated circuits)
 Grid connection, a connection to or from an electrical grid